Violet Elizabeth McGraw (born 22 April 2011) is an American child actress. She began acting at the age of five, with her debut credited role being a recurring role in the 2016 television series Love as Nina, and her first feature film being in 2018's Ready Player One. In 2019 she was nominated for an OFTA Television Award for Best Ensemble in a Motion Picture or Limited Series for The Haunting of Hill House. She is also known for her role as Cady in the 2022 horror film M3GAN.

Career
Violet McGraw started acting at a young age. In 2016, McGraw made her acting debut in Reckless Juliets (2017) as Aria Morgan and the television series Love as Nina (2018). She was most known for roles of Alice in 2019's Jett, her cameo scene as a child in a shopping cart in 2018's blockbuster, directed by Steve Spielberg, Ready Player One. In 2018 she had her first major role as young Nell Crain, younger version of Victoria Pedretti's character, in Mike Flanagan's Netflix series, The Haunting of Hill House. She had been announced as part of the cast in September 2017, and the cast was nominated for the OFTA Television Award for Best Ensemble in 2019. McGraw then went on to star in Drama film Our Friend (2019) as Evie Teague with supporting roles in Doctor Sleep (2019) as Violet and Bennett's War (2019). Based on her experiences in The Haunting of Hill House and Doctor Sleep, McGraw was able to give advice to her older sister Madeleine when the latter starred in the horror film, The Black Phone.

McGraw made her Marvel Cinematic Universe debut in 2021's Black Widow as a young Yelena Belova, with the adult version played by Florence Pugh. In 2021, she also starred in Separation (2021) as Jenny Vahn. She starred with fellow child star Amie Donald as one of the lead characters in the Universal Pictures technological horror film M3GAN, for Blumhouse, released in January 2023. The Hollywood Reporter noted that Donald and co-star McGraw "ended up becoming fast friends by the end of filming".

Personal life
Violet McGraw is youngest of four children. Her older siblings are all also actors: Jack McGraw of The Good Dinosaur, Aidan McGraw of American Sniper, and Madeleine McGraw, who portrays Gwen in The Black Phone.

Filmography

Film

Television

References

External links

American film actresses
Living people
American television actresses
American child actresses
21st-century American actresses
Actresses from California
2011 births